Pąkowo  is a settlement in the administrative district of Gmina Widuchowa, within Gryfino County, West Pomeranian Voivodeship, in north-western Poland, close to the border with Germany.

Before 1945, this area was part of Germany. For the history of the region, see History of Pomerania.

References

Villages in Gryfino County